Deven can be a variant of the Indian masculine given name Devendra. It may also refer to:

Surname
Chimbu Deven (formerly Simbudevan), Tamil film director
Mandy Van Deven (born 1980), American writer and activist

Given name
Deven Bhojani (born 1969), Indian TV serial actor/director
Deven Green (born 1975), Canadian-American comedian, comedy writer and musician
Deven May (born 1971), American Broadway performer, actor and photographer
Deven Sharma (born 1956), Indian-American business executive, president of Standard & Poor's
Deven Thompkins (born 1999), American football player
Deven Verma (1937–2014), Indian film and television actor, particularly known for his comic roles

See also

De Ven
Dev-Em
Devein
Devena
Devens (disambiguation)
Devina
Devine (disambiguation)
Devon (disambiguation)
Devona (disambiguation)
Devonne
Dive In
Teuven